, (born August 24, 1982), known by his stage name , is a Japanese former actor. Sawaki currently works as a tax advisor in his native Osaka, Japan.

Filmography
 Audition (1999)
 A Closing Day (閉じる日) (2000)
 Boogiepop and Others (2000)
 GO! (2001)
 All About Lily Chou-Chou (2001)
 Hush! (ハッシュ!) (2001)
 Gaichu (害虫) (2001)
 Ashita wa kitto (あしたはきっと・・・) (2001)
 Border Line (2002)
 Bright Future (2003)

Television

 Africa Nights (アフリカの夜) (1999)

External links
 
 Sawaki's JMDb Listing (in Japanese)

1982 births
Living people
Male actors from Osaka Prefecture